Katsuyuki (written: , , , ,  or ) is a masculine Japanese given name. Notable people with the name include:

, Japanese table tennis player
, Japanese baseball player
, Japanese baseball player
, Japanese racing driver
, Japanese film director
, Japanese jazz pianist
, Japanese footballer
, Japanese politician
, Japanese rugby union player and coach
, Japanese martial artist
, Japanese voice actor
, Japanese judoka
, Japanese volleyball player
, Japanese skeleton racer
, Japanese footballer
, Japanese actor
, Japanese motorcycle racer
, Japanese footballer
, Japanese rugby union player
, Japanese water polo player

Japanese masculine given names